JST may refer to:

Beijing Jishuitan Hospital
 Japan Science and Technology Corporation (est. 1996)
 Japan Science and Technology Agency (est. 2003)
Japan Standard Time
Jesuit School of Theology of Santa Clara University
Journal of Scientific Temper
Johnstown–Cambria County Airport (IATA: JST, FAA LID: JST)
Joseph Smith Translation of the Bible
JST connector, electrical connectors manufactured by J.S.T. Mfg. Co. (Japan Solderless Terminal)
Jubilee Sailing Trust
Weston Jesuit School of Theology